
Gmina Lwówek is an urban-rural gmina (administrative district) in Nowy Tomyśl County, Greater Poland Voivodeship, in west-central Poland.

Villages
Apart from the town of Lwówek, Gmina Lwówek contains the villages and settlements of Bródki, Brody, Chmielinko, Grońsko, Grudzianka, Józefowo, Komorowice, Komorowo, Konin, Krzywy Las, Linie, Lipka Wielka, Marszewo, Mokre Ogrody, Pakosław, Pawłówek, Posadowo, Tarnowiec, Władysławowo, Wymyślanka, Zębowo, Zgierzynka and Zygmuntowo.

Neighbouring gminas
Gmina Lwówek is bordered by the gminas of Duszniki, Kuślin, Kwilcz, Miedzichowo, Międzychód, Nowy Tomyśl and Pniewy.

References

External links
Polish official population figures 2006

Lwowek
Nowy Tomyśl County